Bozhkov is a Bulgarian masculine surname, its feminine counterpart is Bozhkova. It may refer to

Alexander Bozhkov (1951–2009), Bulgarian politician
Daniel Bozhkov (born 1983), Bulgarian footballer
Stefan Bozhkov (1923–2014), Bulgarian footballer and manager
Svetla Bozhkova (born 1951), Bulgarian discus thrower
Valentin Bozhkov (born 1958), Bulgarian ski jumper

Bulgarian-language surnames